The Booktrust Teenage Prize was an annual award given to young adult literature published in the UK. The prize was administered by Book Trust, an independent charity which promotes books and reading. The Booktrust Teenage Prize was last awarded in 2010 and is no longer running.

List of Prize Winners

2010 Unhooking The Moon by Gregory Hughes
2009 The Graveyard Book by Neil Gaiman
2008 The Knife of Never Letting Go by Patrick Ness
2007 My Swordhand Is Singing by Marcus Sedgwick
2006 Henry Tumour by Anthony McGowan
2005 Century by Sarah Singleton
2004 Looking for JJ by Anne Cassidy
2003 The Curious Incident of the Dog in the Night-Time by Mark Haddon

Shortlists

2010
The Enemy by Charlie Higson
Halo by Zizou Corder
Nobody's Girl by Sarra Manning
Out of Shadows by Jason Wallace
Revolver by Marcus Sedgwick
2009
Auslander by Paul Dowswell
The Graveyard Book by Neil Gaiman
Ostrich Boys by Keith Gray
The Ant Colony by Jenny Valentine
The Vanishing of Katharina Linden by Helen Grant
The Ask and the Answer by Patrick Ness
2008
Creature of the Night by Kate Thompson
The Knife That Killed Me by Anthony McGowan
The Red Necklace by Sally Gardner
Snakehead by Anthony Horowitz
Apache by Tanya Landman
The Knife of Never Letting Go by Patrick Ness
2007
The Medici Seal by Theresa Breslin
Leaving Poppy by Kate Cann
The Penalty by Mal Peet
Here Lies Arthur by Philip Reeve
Just in Case by Meg Rosoff
My Swordhand Is Singing by Marcus Sedgwick
2006
A Swift Pure Cry by Siobhan Dowd
Beast by Ally Kennen
Exchange by Paul Magrs
Henry Tumour by Anthony McGowan
The Foreshadowing by Marcus Sedgwick
Angel Blood by John Singleton
2005
Sugar Rush by Julie Burchill
Siberia by Ann Halam
Come Clean by Terri Paddock
The Whisper by Bali Rai
How I Live Now by Meg Rosoff
Century by Sarah Singleton
The Unrivalled Spangles by Karen Wallace
2004
Unique by Alison Allen-Gray
The Opposite of Chocolate by Julie Bertagna
Looking for JJ by Anne Cassidy
Deep Secret by Berlie Doherty
Fat Boy Swim by Catherine Forde
The Dark Beneath by Alan Gibbons
Rani and Sukh by Bali Rai
Boy Kills Man by Matt Whyman
2003
Lucas by Kevin Brooks
Doing It by Melvin Burgess
Caught in the Crossfire by Alan Gibbons
The Edge by Alan Gibbons
Malarky by Keith Gray
The Curious Incident of the Dog in the Night-Time by Mark Haddon
Doll by Nicky Singer
The Dungeon by Lynne Reid Banks

External links
Booktrust Teenage Prize
Booktrust
Booktrust Teenage Prize Shortlist 2005

Awards established in 2003
2003 establishments in the United Kingdom
Young adult literature awards